Terrence Roberts may refer to:
 Terrence Roberts (born 1941), member of Little Rock Nine
 Terrence Roberts (basketball) (born 1984), former Syracuse Orange basketball player

See also
Terence Roberts, mayor of Anderson, South Carolina, beginning in 2006
Terence Roberts, pen name of Ivan T. Sanderson
Terry Roberts (1946–2006), Australian politician
Terry Roberts (novelist and educator) (born 1956), American author and educator
"My Name is Terry Roberts", a song by Pete Seeger